The Buddha's Dispensation (Pali: Buddha-sāsana) is the teaching - and dissemination of that teaching - of the historical Buddha, Siddhartha Gautama. In Theravada Buddhism that teaching is considered to reside within the Pali Canon and those existing, practical traditions that remain faithful to that dispensation.

The Historical Mission of the Buddha
In his first sermon, 'The Turning of the Wheel of Dhamma', the Buddha explains that as a result of what he had discovered from his years long spiritual quest as a Samana, it had become incumbent upon him to explain this discovery to humanity out of compassion for their welfare and happiness. The essence of this teaching was the Four Noble Truths. Humanity was in a general state of suffering and alienation yet were unaware that there was a Path out of this condition. In order to escape this condition of suffering it was necessary to undertake a course of self-discipline (Pali: Vinaya) that involved adopting a strict code of moral conduct (Pali: sila) and commitment to spiritual development.

See also 
 Cetiya
 Noble Eightfold Path
 Śāsana

References
1:, 
2:

Buddhist eschatology